The Shanghai–Changzhou Expressway, commonly referred to as the Huchang Expressway, is a partially completed  that connects the cities of Shanghai and Changzhou. In Shanghai, it is designated S26, and in Jiangsu, it is designated S58. It connects the cities of Shanghai, Suzhou, Wuxi, and Changzhou and serves as an important expressway between the province of Jiangsu and the direct-controlled municipality of Shanghai. 

The Shanghai portion of the expressway will be  in length, of which  has already been completed. The Jiangsu portion will be  in length, of which  has been completed. The expressway is currently complete between the cities of Shanghai and Suzhou.

References 

Expressways in Shanghai